Vasily Vasilyevich Vereshchagin  (October 26, 1842April 13, 1904) was one of the most famous Russian war artists and one of the first Russian artists to be widely recognised abroad. The graphic nature of his realist scenes led to many of them never being printed or exhibited.

Years of apprenticeship
Vereshchagin was born at Cherepovets, Novgorod Governorate, Russia, in 1842 as the middle of three brothers. His father was a landowner of noble birth, while his mother was of common origin and had Tatar roots. When he was eight years old, he was sent to Tsarskoe Selo to enter the Alexander Cadet Corps. Three years later, he entered the Sea Cadet Corps at St Petersburg, making his first voyage in 1858. He served on the frigate , which sailed to Denmark, France and Egypt.

Vereshchagin graduated first in his list at the naval school, but left the service immediately to begin the study of drawing in earnest. Two years later, in 1863, he won a medal from the St Petersburg Academy for his Ulysses Slaying the Suitors. In 1864, he proceeded to Paris, where he studied under Jean-Léon Gérôme, though he dissented widely from his master's methods.

Travels in Central Asia
In the Paris Salon of 1866, Vereshchagin exhibited a drawing of Dukhobors chanting their Psalms. In the next year, he was invited to accompany General Konstantin Kaufman's expedition to Turkestan. He was granted the rank of ensign. His heroism at the siege of Samarkand from June 2–8, 1868 resulted an award of the Cross of St George (4th class). He was an indefatigable traveller, returning to St Petersburg in late 1868, to Paris in 1869, back to St Petersburg later in the year, and then back to Turkestan via Siberia at the end of 1869.

In 1871, Vereshchagin established an atelier in Munich. He gave a solo exhibition of his works (later referred to as his "Turkestan Series") at the Crystal Palace in London in 1873. He gave another exhibition of his works in St Petersburg in 1874, where two of his paintings, namely, The Apotheosis of War, dedicated "to all conquerors, past, present and to come," and Left Behind, the picture of a dying soldier deserted by his fellows, were denied a showing on the grounds that they portrayed the Russian military in a poor light.

In late 1874, Vereshchagin departed for an extensive tour of the Himalayas, India and Tibet, spending over two years in travel. He returned to Paris in late 1876.

Russo-Turkish War
With the start of the Russo-Turkish War (1877–1878), Vereshchagin left Paris and returned to active service with the Imperial Russian Army. He was present at the crossing of the Shipka Pass and at the Siege of Plevna, where his brother was killed. He was dangerously wounded during the preparations for the crossing of the Danube near Rustchuk. At the conclusion of the war, he acted as secretary to General Skobelev at San Stefano.

World fame
After the war, Vereshchagin settled in Munich, where he produced his war pictures so rapidly that he was freely accused of employing assistants. The sensational subjects of his pictures, and their didactic aim, namely, the promotion of peace by a representation of the horrors of war, attracted a large section of the public not usually interested in art to the series of exhibitions of his pictures in Paris in 1881 and subsequently in London, Berlin, Dresden, Vienna and other cities.

Vereshchagin painted several scenes of imperial rule in British India. His epic portrayal of The State Procession of the Prince of Wales into Jaipur in 1876 is said to be the third largest painting in the world. In 1882–1883, he again traveled to India. 
He aroused much controversy by his series of three pictures: firstly, of a Roman execution (the Crucifixion by the Romans (1887)); secondly, Suppression of the Indian Revolt by the English; and, thirdly, of the execution of Nihilists in St Petersburg. His picture Suppression of the Indian Revolt by the English depicted executions of sepoys carried out by tying victims to the barrels of guns. Vereshchagin's detractors argued that such executions had only occurred in the Indian Rebellion of 1857, but the painting depicted modern soldiers of the 1880s, implying that the practice was then current. Because of its photographic style, the painting appeared to present itself as an impartial record of a real event. In 1887 Vereshchagin defended himself in The Magazine of Art by saying that if there were another rebellion then the British would use this method again.

By the late 19th century, Vereshchagin had gained popularity, not only in Russia, but also abroad and his name never left the pages of the European and American press. From his earliest works, unlike most contemporary battle pieces depicting war as a kind of parade, Vereshchagin graphically depicted the horrors of war. "I loved the sun all my life, and wanted to paint sunshine. When I happened to see warfare and say what I thought about it, I rejoiced that I would be able to devote myself to the sun once again. But the fury of war continued to pursue me". Vereshchagin wrote. One day, in 1882, Vereshchagin's exhibition in Berlin was visited by German field marshal Helmuth von Moltke the Elder. Vereshchagin brought Moltke to his painting The Apotheosis of War. The picture evoked a sort of confusion in the field marshal. After his visit to the exhibition, Moltke issued an order forbidding German soldiers to visit it. The Austrian war minister did the same. He also declined the artist's offer to let Austrian officers see his pictures free of charge at the 1881 exhibition in Vienna.

In Russia, a ban on exhibitions of Vereshchagin's work was also enforced, as well as a ban on reproductions of them in books and periodicals amidst accusations of slandering the Russian army. The artist took these unjust accusations badly and burned three of his paintings, The Forgotten Soldier, They Have Encircled, and Pursue and They Entered.

A journey in Syria and Palestine in 1884 furnished him with an equally discussed set of subjects from the New Testament.
Vereshchagin's paintings caused controversy over his portrayal of the figure of Christ with what was thought at the time to be an unseemly realism. His depiction of Jesus's features was thought to be excessively vulgar and over-emphatically Semitic in ethnicity.

The "1812" series on Napoleon's Russian campaign, on which Vereshchagin also wrote a book, seems to have been inspired by Tolstoi's War and Peace, and was painted in 1893 in Moscow, where the artist eventually settled.

Last years

Vereshchagin was in the Far East during the First Sino-Japanese War of 1894–1895, and was with the Russian troops in Manchuria during the Boxer Rebellion of 1900. In 1901, he visited the Philippines, in 1902 the United States and Cuba, and in 1903, Japan.

During the Russo-Japanese War, he was invited by Admiral Stepan Makarov to join him aboard Makarov's battleship, .  On April 13, 1904, Petropavlovsk struck two mines while returning to Port Arthur and sank, taking with it most of the crew, including both Admiral Makarov and Vereshchagin.  Vereshchagin's last work, a picture of a council of war presided over by Admiral Makarov, was recovered almost undamaged.<ref> "State Historical Museum Opens 'The Year 1812 in the Paintings by Vasily Vereshchagin'," Art Daily, March 11, 2010;  "War Lasted 18 Months ... Russian Miscalculation," New York Times, August 30, 1905.</ref>

Legacy
 The town of Vereshchagino in Perm Krai is named after him, as well as a minor planet, 3410 Vereshchagin, discovered by Soviet astronomer Lyudmila Zhuravlyova in 1978.
 Vereshchagin Street in Cherepovets is named after Vasily Vereshchagin, also there are a historic house museum and a monument to Vereshchagin in Cherepovets.
 He is a distant relative of the Czech rock singer Aleš Brichta. The Apotheosis of War was used by Czech heavy metal band Arakain as the cover art for the album Farao.

 Gallery 

See also

 List of Orientalist artists
 Orientalism

Further reading
 ; 
 

Pleshakov, Constantine. "The Tsar's Last Armada-The Epic Voyage to the Battle of Tsushima."  (2002).

Notes

References

 Kowner, Rotem (2006). "Historical Dictionary of the Russo-Japanese War". Scarecrow. 620pp. 
 Leonard D. Abbott, "Verestchagin, Painter of War." The Comrade (New York), vol. 1, no. 7 (April 1902), pp. 155–156.
Art Institute of Chicago, Works of Vassili Verestchagin: an Illustrated, descriptive catalogue and two appendixes to the catalogue Realism and Progress in Art by Verestchagin.
W. T. Stead, "Vassili Verestchagin: Character Sketch," Review of Reviews (London), vol. 19 (January 1899), frontispiece, 22–33.
Maria Chernysheva, "The Russian Gérôme? Vereshchagin as a Painter of Turkestan," RIHA Journal'', September 2014.

External links

Vereshchagin page at Olga's Gallery
Vasily Vereshchagin: horrors of war through artist’s eyes
Vereshchagin's lost paintings 
 

1842 births
1904 deaths
People from Cherepovets
19th-century painters from the Russian Empire
Russian male painters
20th-century Russian painters
Realist painters
Orientalist painters
Painters from Saint Petersburg
Russian war artists
Russian military personnel of the Russo-Turkish War (1877–1878)
Russian military personnel of the Russo-Japanese War
Russian military personnel killed in the Russo-Japanese War
19th-century war artists
Russian people of Tatar descent
Naval Cadet Corps alumni